Reinhold W. Smyczek (August 18, 1918 – May 18, 1994 ) was a Polish military officer and an émigré political activist.

Decorations
1945 : Silver Cross of the Order Virtuti Militari by the Polish Government in Exile
1981: Knight's Cross of the Order of Polonia Restituta
1986: Officer's Cross of the Order of Polonia Restituta "for the work dedicated to independence and national treasure" 
1994 Commander's Cross of the Order of Merit of the Republic of Poland (posthumously)

References

1918 births
1994 deaths
Polish Army officers
Polish emigrants to the United States
Commanders of the Order of Merit of the Republic of Poland
Officers of the Order of Polonia Restituta
Knights of the Order of Polonia Restituta
Recipients of the Silver Cross of the Virtuti Militari